Losen Records (initiated 2010 in Oslo, Norway) is a Norwegian record label founded by Odd Gjelsnes at the distribution company MusikkLosen.

Background 
The distribution company MusikkLosen was founded in 1997 by Odd Gjelsnes, and Losen Records, which is under the operation of MusikkLosen, had its first album release with the album Norwegian Song 3 by Dag Arnesen in late 2010. MusikkLosen distributes music in the genres jazz, classical, rock, blues, ethnic, soundtracks and more. The company is currently (2014) working on its 27th album release within the last three years. Alongside a partner, the company has also built its own recording studio in Spain called Studio Barxeta, which had its first album recording with Alex Acuña, Jan Gunnar Hoff and Per Mathisen in August 2012.

Discography 
Albums (in selection)

References

External links 

Norwegian record labels
Record labels established in 2010
Culture in Oslo
2010 establishments in Norway